Janet Bina Kahama (born May 19, 1943) is a Member of Parliament in the National Assembly of Tanzania.

External links
Parliament of Tanzania website

Living people
Tanzanian MPs 2005–2010
Place of birth missing (living people)
1943 births
21st-century Tanzanian women politicians